Anne-Catherine Lacroix (also Ann-Catherine Lacroix) is a Belgian fashion model.

Life
Anne-Catherine Lacroix was born on 3 March 1978 in Brussels, Belgium. She can speak three languages (Flemish, French, and English), and she has a degree in political sciences.

Career
She made her modelling debut on the runway in 1999. Since then, she has gone on to walk the shows of some of the greatest brands in the fashion industry for many seasons (both ready to wear and couture shows), including Chanel, Prada, Alexander McQueen, Miu Miu, Marc Jacobs, and Givenchy. She has appeared in campaigns for big labels such as Jil Sander, Yves Saint Laurent, Balenciaga, and Louis Vuitton. She has been inside and on the cover magazines including i-D, Marie Claire, and Vogue (multiple countries).

References

1978 births
Living people
Belgian female models